James Marshall (born 1962) is a Canadian television producer and director, best known for his work on Smallville, Dead Like Me, The O.C. and Wednesday.

Career
On the TV series Smallville, Marshall had an important role throughout the history of the show. When Greg Beeman stopped directing high-profile Smallville episodes (due to his commitment to Heroes), series creators Alfred Gough and Miles Millar began to look to Marshall, who first began directing on Smallville during the second half of the first season. After producing Smallville for many years, starting in season seven, Marshall became an executive producer on the show. With this position, Marshall began directing fewer episodes, and in season nine he directed zero episodes, returning to directing once in season 10.

Filmography

References

External links

1962 births
Living people
American television directors
American television producers
Place of birth missing (living people)